William Earnshaw may refer to:
 William Earnshaw (politician), New Zealand member of parliament
 William Earnshaw (minister), American minister
 William C. Earnshaw, professor of chromosome dynamics